Harry Taylor is an outspoken critic of the Bush administration, noted for his controversial question posed to President Bush in a North Carolina town hall meeting at Central Piedmont Community College on April 6, 2006.  Taylor criticized Bush's warrantless wiretapping program and treatment of enemy combatants, among other actions, and asked that the president express some manner of shame for his actions.  President Bush refused to do so.

Taylor's confrontation has since been praised in independent liberal publications, and noted for its surprising rarity given the prevalence of such opinions among Americans.

On October 30, 2007, Harry Taylor sent an email to signers of the ThankYouHarryTaylor.net site announcing that he was running for Congress in the 2008 election. He, unsuccessfully, kicked off a challenge to the Republican incumbent in North Carolina's 9th congressional district, Sue Myrick, on November 13, 2007.

Background
Taylor was born and raised in northern New Jersey, earned a B.A. from Colgate University, served in the U.S. Air Force, lived and worked in real estate and development in Colorado for many years and relocated to Charlotte, North Carolina in 1987. He owns a commercial real estate brokerage and is an old-time banjo player.

External links
harrytaylorforcountycommission.com
harrytaylorforcongress.com
ThankYouHarryTaylor.net
thinkprogress.org

Living people
Year of birth missing (living people)
Colgate University alumni
American activists
North Carolina Democrats